Guillaume Hubert (born 11 January 1994) is a Belgian footballer who plays for Oostende, as a goalkeeper.

Club career 

Hubert is a youth exponent from Standard Liège. On 25 October 2015, he made his Belgian Pro League debut with Standard Liège against Charleroi. In June 2017, he joined Club Brugge.

Career statistics

Club

Honours
Standard Liège
Belgian Cup: 2015–16

References

External links
 
 
 
 Guillaume Hubert at KBVB

1994 births
Sportspeople from Charleroi
Footballers from Hainaut (province)
Living people
Belgian footballers
Belgium under-21 international footballers
Belgium youth international footballers
Association football goalkeepers
Standard Liège players
Valenciennes FC players
Sint-Truidense V.V. players
Club Brugge KV players
Cercle Brugge K.S.V. players
K.V. Oostende players
Belgian Pro League players
Championnat National 2 players
Belgian expatriate footballers
Expatriate footballers in France
Belgian expatriate sportspeople in France